Stefan Schwarzmann (born 11 November 1965) is a German drummer who has recorded for Accept, U.D.O., Running Wild, X-Wild, Krokus and Helloween. Schwarzmann joined Helloween as a replacement for departing drummer Mark Cross in 2003. Although Stefan got on well with the members of the band, he had other musical preferences. As a result, he chose to leave Helloween after the Rabbits on the Run Tour in early 2005.

In 2012, Schwarzmann and guitarist Mille Petrozza were contracted to record the album Revolution with Lacrimosa.

Equipment
Schwarzmann currently endorses Pearl drums, Aquarian drumheads, Wincent drumsticks, and Paiste cymbals:

 Signature 18" heavy china
 Signature 14" sound edge hi-hats
 Signature 19" full crash
 Signature 20" full crash
 2002 20" crash
 Signature Dark Energy Mark l 20" dark dry ride
 2002 14" sound edge hi-hats
 2002 20" novo china
 Signature reflector 22" heavy full rash

References

External links 
 

German heavy metal drummers
Male drummers
German male musicians
Accept (band) members
Helloween members
Living people
1965 births
Krokus (band) members
U.D.O. members